Cymbonotus is a genus of flowering plants in the daisy family from southern Australia. Three species are recognised. The type species is  C. lawsonianus of eastern Australia, commonly known as bear's ears.

Molecular studies of African genera and C. lawsonianus showed the genus to be very closely related to the genera Arctotis and Haplocarpha, suggesting they must have been dispersed across the Indian Ocean to Australia somehow.

References

Asteraceae genera
Asteraceae